Sir Augustus Helder (1827 – 31 March 1906) was a British solicitor and Conservative politician who served as the MP for Whitehaven. He won the seat from the Liberals in 1895, held it in 1900, but stood down in 1906, only two months before he died. He was knighted in 1905.

Sources

Craig, F.W.S. British Parliamentary Election Results 1885-1918
Whitaker's Almanack, 1896 to 1906 editions

Conservative Party (UK) MPs for English constituencies
Cumbria MPs
UK MPs 1895–1900
UK MPs 1900–1906
1827 births
1906 deaths
Knights Bachelor